The 2009–10 IFA Premiership (known as the Carling Premiership for sponsorship reasons) was the second season of the league in this format since its establishment after a major overhaul of the league system in Northern Ireland, and the 109th season of Irish league football overall. It began on 8 August 2009 and ended on 1 May 2010. Glentoran were the defending champions. On 27 April 2010, Linfield clinched the title after a 1–0 victory against Cliftonville at Windsor Park. On 14 May 2010, Institute were relegated to the 2010–11 IFA Championship, after losing the two-legged relegation play-off to Donegal Celtic, who took their place in the 2010–11 IFA Premiership.

Team changes from 2008–09
On 2 February 2009, Bangor's board announced that they would not be able to renew their domestic licence due to financial difficulties, and thereby would not compete in this season's premiership. They finished the 2008–09 season in 11th place. As a consequence, 12th-placed Dungannon Swifts, who were originally going to be directly relegated to the IFA Championship, earned the relegation play-off berth from Bangor. After a two-legged series against 2008–09 Championship runners-up Donegal Celtic, which ended in an aggregated 2–2 tie, Dungannon eventually retained their Premiership status on away goals.

Promoted from the Championship were 2008–09 champions Portadown, which marked their return to the highest football league of Northern Ireland after a one-year hiatus.

Stadia and locations

League table

Results

Matches 1–22
During matches 1–22 each team played every other team twice (home and away).

Matches 23–33
During matches 23–33 each team played every other team for the third time (either at home, or away).

Matches 34–38
During matches 34–38 each team played every other team in their half of the table once. As this was the fourth time that teams played each other this season, home sides in this round were chosen so that teams had played each other twice at home and twice away.

Section A

Section B

Top scorers

Promotion/relegation play-off
The promotion/relegation play-off was slightly altered this season because Donegal Celtic, runners-up of the 2009–10 IFA Championship, were the only IFA Championship club to hold the Domestic Club Licence required to participate in the Premiership. Lisburn Distillery, who finished in 11th place, avoided having to play a relegation play-off, which was passed down instead to Institute, who finished in 12th place and would normally have been automatically relegated. The first leg ended 0-0, with Institute having a penalty saved in injury-time at the end of the game. The second leg stayed goalless until the 85th minute, when Stephen McAlorum scored for Donegal Celtic, to relegate Institute to the 2010–11 IFA Championship.

Donegal Celtic won 1–0 on aggregate and were promoted, Institute were relegated

IFA Premiership clubs in Europe 2009–10

UEFA coefficient and ranking
For the 2009–10 UEFA competitions, the associations were allocated places according to their 2008 UEFA country coefficients, which took into account their performance in European competitions from 2003–04 to 2007–08. In the 2008 rankings used for this season's European competitions, Northern Ireland's coefficient points total was 2.332. After earning a score of 0.500 during the 2007–08 European campaign, the league was ranked by UEFA as the 46th best league in Europe out of 53 - not moving from the previous season. This season Northern Ireland earned only 0.125 points, which was added to the points total for the 2010 rankings used in 2011–12 UEFA competitions.

 44  Armenia 3.665
 45  Kazakhstan 2.582
 46  Northern Ireland 2.332
 47  Wales 2.331
 48  Faroe Islands 1.832
 Full list

UEFA Champions League
Having won the league in 2008–09 Glentoran represented the league in the premier football competition. They started in the second qualifying round, and were handed a tough draw against Israeli side Maccabi Haifa. Their worst fears were confirmed as they were hammered 6–0 away and 4–0 at home, 10–0 on aggregate. This ended Glentoran's participation in European football for the season.

UEFA Europa League
Due to the abolition of the Intertoto Cup in 2008, the remaining teams qualified for the new Europa League instead. Linfield and Lisburn Distillery entered in the first qualifying round. The Blues were drawn against Danish club Randers. This was not a pleasant experience however, as after a 4–0 defeat in Denmark, Randers completed the disappointment with a 3–0 win at Mourneview Park, with Linfield forced to use Glenavon's ground as work was being done to the pitch at their Windsor Park home.

Lisburn Distillery were handed a tie with FC Zestafoni from Georgia. Despite being confident of qualification, they were taken apart 5–1 at home. With only pride to play for in the second leg, Lisburn were dumped out of Europe after a 6–0 hammering, which meant they lost the tie 11–1 on aggregate.

The last remaining club from Northern Ireland, Crusaders entered in the second qualifying round. They were drawn with FK Rabotnički from Macedonia. With not even a draw for a Northern Irish side before they started, Crusaders were the only hope of restoring pride to the league after some damaging European experiences in the weeks before. In a superb home performance, they did just that with a welcome 1–1 draw. They were quite unlucky in the second leg, where they were defeated 4–2 and 5–3 on aggregate. This result ended the IFA Premiership's interest in European competition for the remainder of the season.

References

NIFL Premiership seasons
North
1